Faysal Ali Warabe (born 1948), also spelled Faisal Ali Warabe, is a Somalilander engineer and politician. He previously served as Director of Planning and Building as well as Regional Director of Somalia's Ministry of Public Works. Additionally, Warabe is the founder and chairman of the Justice and Welfare Party (UCID).

Life and education
Warabe was born in 1948 in Hargeisa, British Somaliland. He hails from the Eidagale sub-clan of the Garhajis Isaaq.

Waraabe completed his primary, Intermediate and Secondary education in Somaliland.
For his post-secondary education, Waraabe studied at Somali National University where he learned courses in teacher training, Warabe studied in the Soviet Union. He earned an M. Sc. in Engineering in 1973 from an institution in Leningrad.
Between 1997 and 2001, Warabe also matriculated at the University of Helsinki's Faculty of Social Sciences, where he attended courses in the Social Policy Department. He later moved to Espoo.

Warabe is married. He speaks several languages, including Somali, Arabic, English, Russian and Finnish. Warabe received Finnish citizenship in 1999.

Son's death
Warabe's son Sayid Hussein Feisal Ali Warabe (born 1991) died on 29 December 2017 in Syria. Sayid Hussein Feisal Ali, who had Finnish citizenship and who was also known as Abu Shuayb as-Somali (from Finland), had traveled from Finland to Syria in early 2013 to become a jihadi fighter, first joining al-Nusra and later ISIS. His cousin, Abu Mansuur Somali, also left Leppävaara for Syria and it is believed the two became radicalised together. Faysal Ali, who had warned Finnish authorities about his son, believes Sayid Hussein Feisal Ali was killed in an airstrike.

Career
An engineer by profession, Warabe began his career as the president of AYAAN, a local Somali construction company. He later worked as a Chief Engineer in Mogadishu.

Warabe subsequently served with the Somalia central government as the Director of Planning and Building in the Ministry of Public Works. He was later appointed the Ministry's Regional Director.

In 2001, Warabe founded the Justice and Welfare Party (UCID) in Somaliland. Serving as the political association's Chairman, UCID came in third place in the 2003 regional elections, receiving 16% of votes.

Work
Main offices
Regional Director, Ministry of Public Works, Somalia
Director of Planning & Building, Ministry of Public Works
Chief Engineer, Mogadishu, Somalia
President of AYAAN construction company

Other positions held
Chairman of Somaliland Society in Europe (2001)
Chairman of Somali Social Democrats Party (2001)
Chairman of Somaliland Association in Finland (1998-2001)
Chairman of Somali Social Democrats Party (1997)

Other activities
Spokesman for Somaliland Peace Committee, 1995

Notes

References

External links

1948 births
Ethnic Somali people
Living people
People from Hargeisa
Somalian emigrants to Finland
Somalian engineers
Somaliland politicians
University of Helsinki alumni
Finnish people of Somali descent
Naturalized citizens of Finland